Twarogi Ruskie  (translation: Russian Cottage Cheeses) is a village in the administrative district of Gmina Perlejewo, within Siemiatycze County, Podlaskie Voivodeship, in north-eastern Poland.

References

Twarogi Ruskie